Jurgis Šaulys (1879–1948) was a Lithuanian economist, diplomat, and politician, and one of the twenty signatories to the 1918 Act of Independence of Lithuania.

Šaulys attended secondary school in Palanga and attended the Kaunas Theological Seminary. He was dismissed from the seminary for participating in the Knygnešiai movement, which disseminated materials published in the Lithuanian language, a practice outlawed at the time. After moving to Vilnius in 1900, he continued his political actitivites; he became one of the 12 Apostles of the independence movement, and was one of the founders of the Lithuanian Democratic Party. He left for Switzerland to study economics at the University of Bern, receiving his doctorate in 1912, but still contributed to these activities while abroad.

Returning to Vilnius in 1912, he edited the Lietuvos Žinios (Lithuanian News). After World War I broke out he served various charitable organizations. He was a member of the Vilnius Conference and was elected Secretary-General of the ensuing Council of Lithuania, signing the Act of Independence in 1918.

Šaulys went into the diplomatic service immediately afterwards, serving as an envoy to Germany, Switzerland, the Vatican, and Poland. In the wake of the German invasion of Poland in 1939, he moved to Lugano in Switzerland with his wife, the Italian opera singer Mafalda Salvatini, acting as the Lithuanian ambassador in Berne until the legation was closed in 1946. He died in Lugano two years later.

A dedicated bibliophile, he donated much of his collection to the Vytautas Magnus University; the remainder of his collection is held at the University of Pennsylvania.

References

"Šaulys, Jurgis". Encyclopedia Lituanica V: 78-79. (1970-1978). Ed. Simas Sužiedėlis. Boston, Massachusetts: Juozas Kapočius. LCCN 74-114275.

1879 births
1948 deaths
Lithuanian diplomats
Baltic diplomatic missions
Lithuanian book smugglers
Lithuanian book and manuscript collectors
Members of the Council of Lithuania
University of Bern alumni
Lithuanian independence activists
People from Lugano
Lithuanian expatriates in Switzerland
People from Palanga